Rhythm Tech is a manufacturer of percussion instruments, particularly known for the production of a crescent-shaped tambourine which is now featured in the Museum of Modern Art and which has since spawned many imitators.

The Rhythm Tech tambourine, designed by Richard Taninbaum in 1978, was the company's original product and is still in their catalogue.

External links
 Company website
 1980 - 2010: Celebrating 30 Years of Innovation at the company website.
 Richard Taninbaum Interview NAMM Oral History Library (2010)

References

Percussion instrument manufacturing companies
Musical instrument manufacturing companies of the United States
Manufacturing companies established in 1980